Five ships have been named City of Benares, after the former name of Varanasi,  a city on the banks of the Ganges in Uttar Pradesh, India.

 , a three-masted sailing ship of 751 net register tons. Burnt-out at Calcutta, 28 January 1865
 , a sailing ship of 1,182 tons. 1881 sold and renamed Ruthin, rigged as barque. Renamed Laugen, 1900. Sank in the Baltic Sea, 10 February 1911.
 , a full-rigged sailing ship of 1,652 gross register tons. Wrecked at Westkapelle, Walcheren on 1 October 1911
 , a 6,984-gross register ton liner of the Ellerman Line; 1914–1918 troopship, scrapped February 1933 (A Titanic survivor, Ruth Becker, sailed aboard her).
  (1936), an 11,081-gross register ton liner of the Ellerman City Line.  torpedoed and sank her on 17 September 1940 while City of Benares was carrying 90 child evacuees. 258 people died including 81 children.

See also
 , a P&O steamship. 1,900 tons, 400 horsepower. On Britain to Australia route in 1859. N. J. Skottowe, Esq., Commander. Wrecked on 23 May 1868 in the South China Sea.

References

Set index articles on ships
Ship names